Noticias Uno (known from 1992 to 2002 as NTC Noticias) is a nightly Colombian newscast produced by NTC Televisión and aired weekends and holidays on pay TV channel CableNoticias. The program was formerly on state-owned privately run Canal Uno.

Until 2011 its director was Daniel Coronell; since mid-2011 he was replaced by Cecilia Orozco Tascón. Silvia Corzo, Néstor Morales, María Fernanda Navia and Germán Arango are its presenters.

The newscast is known for being critical of former president Álvaro Uribe Vélez and keeping distance with former president Juan Manuel Santos. From 14 August 2017, the presenter is the former Caracol Televisión, Mábel Lara. The program was cancelled during September 2019. As of 1 December, the program airs on pay television channel CableNoticias

References

External links
Official website
Twitter account (@noticiasuno)

Colombian television news shows
1992 Colombian television series debuts
1990s Colombian television series
2000s Colombian television series
2010s Colombian television series